Alexios Palaiologos or Alexius Palaeologus may refer to:

 Alexios Palaiologos, son of George Palaiologos
 Alexios Palaiologos (despot) (d. 1203), grandson of the above, son-in-law of Alexios III Angelos, maternal grandfather of Michael VIII Palaiologos
 Alexios Palaiologos (megas doux), admiral, paternal grandfather of Michael VIII
 Alexios Palaiologos Tzamplakon (fl. 1430s), Byzantine official